The 2005 Turkish Grand Prix (officially the 2005 Formula 1 Turkish Grand Prix) was a Formula One motor race held on 21 August 2005 at Istanbul Park, Tuzla, Turkey. It was the fourteenth race of the 2005 FIA Formula One World Championship and the inaugural Turkish Grand Prix.

The 58-lap race was won by Finnish driver Kimi Räikkönen, driving a McLaren-Mercedes. Räikkönen took his fifth victory of the season after starting from pole position and leading every lap. Räikkönen's Colombian teammate, Juan Pablo Montoya, ran second until he collided with a backmarker and then ran wide in the closing laps, allowing Spaniard Fernando Alonso through in his Renault.

With five races remaining, Alonso led the Drivers' Championship by 24 points from Räikkönen, while Renault's lead over McLaren in the Constructors' Championship was nine points.

Friday drivers
The bottom six teams in the 2004 Constructors' Championship were entitled to run a third car in free practice on Friday. These drivers drove on Friday but did not compete in qualifying or the race.

Classification

Qualifying

 Takuma Sato was found guilty of blocking Mark Webber and was relegated to the back of the grid, behind Michael Schumacher who had a spin at Turn 9 and had his V10 engine changed following qualification. Sato was unaware of Webber approaching as he had been reported to have no radio contact with the BAR team.
 Robert Doornbos failed to set a time after his Minardi's brakes caught fire due to an incorrect brake pipe fitting.
 Narain Karthikeyan's Jordan suffered two engine failures.

Race

 Michael Schumacher and Mark Webber collided on lap 14. The rear suspension of Schumacher's Ferrari was damaged, but after repairs he rejoined the race to improve his qualifying slot for the next race in Italy by three positions. Webber's Williams lost the nose cone.
 Felipe Massa lost the front wing and bargeboard from his Sauber in a first-corner collision with the Williams of former teammate Nick Heidfeld. After replacements were fitted, Massa continued racing until his engine failed on lap 29.
 Both Williams cars retired from the race due to right-rear tyre failures - Webber on lap 21 and Heidfeld on lap 30.
 Juan Pablo Montoya was running second on the penultimate lap when he clashed with the Jordan of Tiago Monteiro, damaging his diffuser. On the next lap Montoya ran straight ahead at Turn 8, allowing Fernando Alonso to pass him.
 Montoya's fastest lap was over two seconds faster than his teammate's qualifying time.

Championship standings after the race 
Bold text indicates who still has a theoretical chance of becoming World Champion.

Drivers' Championship standings

Constructors' Championship standings

See also 
 2005 Istanbul Park GP2 Series round

References

Turkish Grand Prix
Grand Prix
Turkish Grand Prix
August 2005 sports events in Turkey